Oberschleißheim station is located in the town of Oberschleißheim in the German state of Bavaria and is served by the Munich S-Bahn. It lies on the Munich–Regensburg railway, about 20 kilometres from the Munich Central Station (Hauptbahnhof).

Schleissheim station

A station was built in Oberschleißheim during the construction of the line to Landshut and on to Regensburg. This was called Schleißheim and was just west of Schleissheim Palace. In addition to the facilities for passenger operations there were freight tracks, some company sidings, a branch line to Garching-Hochbrück and a siding to Schleissheim Airfield (Flugplatz Schleißheim, the oldest operating airport in Germany, built in 1912). With the construction of the Munich S-Bahn in 1972, the station was closed for passenger traffic and replaced by the new Oberschleißheim station. This was built a kilometre towards Freising. The handling of freight wagons stopped in the mid-1980s and the sidings were gradually dismantled. The station building is preserved and can be seen from the line. Some disused tracks, which are overgrown with grass, are visible to the west of the line. Today at the location of the station there is only a crossover between the two tracks, which is remotely controlled.

The current station is situated in the northern part of the village. The station has three platform tracks. Track 1 is used by line S1 services of the Munich S-Bahn towards the city centre.  Track 2 is used by S-Bahn services terminating or starting in Oberschleißheim or being overhauled. A single-track siding to the north of the station is reached from here. Track 3 is used by S-Bahn trains towards Freising and the Airport. Track 1 and 2 are located on a central platform, while track 3 is on a side platform. The platform can be reached through underpasses. The northern underpasses has lifts, giving access for the disabled, and connects to the bus stop in the station forecourt. Park and ride parking is at the southern end of the station. The southern end of the station is crossed by a road bridge.

References

External links

Munich S-Bahn stations
Railway stations in Germany opened in 1972